Derrick Rowland (born June 21, 1959) is a retired American professional basketball player who is the head coach of the Potawatomi Fire. He previously worked as the head coach of the Albany Patroons of The Basketball League (TBL). Born in Brookhaven, New York, during his playing career, he was a 6'5" tall, 195-pound shooting guard.

College career
Rowland completed college at State University of New York at Potsdam. He averaged 18.7 points and 8.8 rebounds to power Potsdam State to the NCAA Division III championship during the 1980-81 season.

Professional career
Rowland was picked in the tenth round of the 1981 NBA draft by the Denver Nuggets, in the National Basketball Association (NBA) draft. When he failed to make the Denver lineup, Rowland drifted to the Continental league, where he played for the Albany Patroons, for seven years.

In 1981-82, Rowland averaged 7.3 points for the Rochester Zeniths, and was cut the next campaign, after playing only four games with the Albany club. In March 1986, he was signed by the Milwaukee Bucks, as a free agent, and played 2 games with the Bucks, in the 1985-86 NBA season.

Philippine stint
Rowland was one of the two American reinforcements, along with the late Bobby Parks, who played for Shell Rimula X, during the Third Conference of the 1988 Philippine Basketball Association (PBA) season. He scored a high of 51 points, on October 11, 1988, and led his team all the way to the finals.

NBA career statistics

Regular season 

|-
| align="left" | 1985-86
| align="left" | Milwaukee
| 2 || 0 || 4.5 || .333 || .000 || .500 || 0.5 || 0.5 || 0.0 || 0.0 || 1.5
|-
| align="left" | Career
| align="left" | 
| 2 || 0 || 4.5 || .333 || .000 || .500 || 0.5 || 0.5 || 0.0 || 0.0 || 1.5

References

1959 births
Living people
Albany Patroons players
American expatriate basketball people in the Philippines
American men's basketball players
Basketball players from New York (state)
Bay State Bombardiers players
Continental Basketball Association coaches
Denver Nuggets draft picks
Milwaukee Bucks players
North American Premier Basketball coaches
Philippine Basketball Association imports
Rochester Zeniths players
Shooting guards
SUNY Potsdam Bears men's basketball players
Shell Turbo Chargers players